Ace Magazines was a comic book and pulp-magazine publishing company headed by Aaron A. Wyn and his wife Rose Wyn. The Wyns had been publishing pulp fiction under the Periodical House and A. A. Wyn's Magazine Publishers names since 1928, and published comics between 1940 and the end of 1956.

Its most successful and longest-running superhero title was Super-Mystery Comics featuring Magno the Magnetic Man and his boy partner Davey, who appeared in 28 issues of the title's 48-issue run. Magno is nearly unique among superheroes for having neither an origin for his powers or any apparent secret identity. Horror comics included Baffling Mysteries, Hand of Fate and Web of Mystery, while their contribution to the crime comics was Crime Must Pay the Penalty (the title later shortened to Penalty for the final two issues). Ace's longest running series were the company's romance comics Glamorous Romances, Love At First Sight, Love Experiences and Real Love, which began in the late 1940s as the superhero books faded away, and continued until the company ceased publishing comic books in 1956. Other long running romance titles such as Complete Love Magazine and Ten Story Love began as pulp-magazine titles before switching to comics format in the early 1950s.

A number of Ace stories were used as examples of violent and gruesome imagery in the 1950s U.S Congressional inquiries into the influence of comic books on juvenile delinquency that led to the Comics Code Authority, namely Challenge of the Unknown #6, Crime Must Pay the Penalty #3 and Web of Mystery #19. Western Adventures Comics #3 was used as an example in Fredric Wertham's Seduction of the Innocent, and in the United Kingdom Atomic War #4, Beyond #18 and World War III #2 were cited as examples by Geoffrey Wagner's 1954 book on the same subject, Parade of Pleasure — A Study of Popular Iconography in the U.S.A.

Although characters with the same names as Ace Comics characters have appeared elsewhere (most notably Jack Kirby's Captain Victory in an early 1980s series, and several DC Comics villains called the Black Spider), after the early 1950s all their characters remained unused until 2008, when Lash Lightning and Lightning Girl appeared in flashback in Dynamite Entertainment’s Project Superpowers. In the one-shot Project Superpowers: Chapter Two Prelude, it was stated that the two of them will appear in this line as part of a team called The Super-Mysterymen (presumably named after the Ace title Super-Mystery Comics).

Comics published

Imprints
Ace Magazine comic-book series were published through at least 17 affiliated entities:
A. A. Wyn, Inc.
Ace Books, Inc.
Ace Magazines, Inc.
Ace Periodicals, Inc.
Ace Publications
Ace Publications, Inc.
Current Books, Inc.
Humor Publications, Inc.
Junior Books, Inc.
Junior Magazines, Inc.
L. B. Fischer Publishing Corp.
Periodical House, Inc.
Publishers Specialists, Inc.
RAR Publishing Co., Inc.
Readers' Research, Inc.
Red Seal Publications, Inc.	
Unity Publishing Corp.

Titles
 All-Love / All Love Romances ( #May 26, 1949 - #32 May 1950) - under Ace Periodicals / Current Books imprint
 All-Romances (#August 1, 1949 - #June 6, 1950) - under AA Wyn / Ace Periodicals imprint
 Andy Comics  (#June 20, 1948 - #August 21, 1948) - under Current Publications imprint
 Atomic War! (#Nov 1, 1952 - #April 4, 1953) - under Ace Periodicals / Junior Books imprint
 Baffling Mysteries (#November 5, 1951 -  #October 26, 1955) - under Periodical House imprint
 Banner Comics (#September 3, 1941 - #January 5, 1942)
 Beyond, The (#November 1, 1950 - #January 30, 1955)
 Captain Courageous Comics (#6 1942) - under Periodical House imprint
 Challenge of the Unknown (#September 6, 1950)
 Complete Love Magazine (v26#2 May 1951 - v32#4 September 1956) - under Ace Periodicals / Periodical House imprint
 Crime Must Pay the Penalty (#33 February 1948 (issue #1), #June 2, 1948 - #46 1955) - under Current Books imprint
 Dotty and Her Boyfriends (#35 June 1948 - #40 May 1949) - under AA Wyn imprint
 Ernie Comics (#September 22, 1948 - #March 25, 1949) - under Current Books imprint
 Four Favorites (#September 1, 1941 - #32 December 1947)
 Four Teeners (#34 April 1948)
 Fun Time (#1 Spring 1953 - #4 Winter 1953/4) - under Ace Periodicals imprint
 Glamorous Romances (#41 July 1949 - #90 October 1956) - under AA Wyn imprint
 Hand of Fate (#December 8, 1951 - #December 25, 1954 - includes 2 issue #25's)
 Hap Hazard Comics (Summer 1944 - #February 24, 1949) - under Reader Research imprint
 Heroes of the Wild Frontier ( 2 issues - #January 27, 1956 - #April 2, 1956) - under Ace Periodicals imprint
 Indian Braves (#March 1, 1951 - #September 4, 1951) - under Ace Magazines imprint
 Lightning Comics (#December 4, 1940 - #June 13, 1942)
 Love At First Sight (#October 1, 1949 - #43 November 1956) - Under RAR Publishing Co / Periodical House imprints
 Love Experiences (#October 1, 1949 - #38 June 1956) - under AA Wyn / Periodical House imprint
 Men Against Crime (#February 3, 1951 - #October 7, 1951) - under Ace Magazines imprint
 Monkeyshines Comics (#1 Summer 1944 - #July 27, 1949) - under Ace / Publishers Specialists / Current Books / Unity Publishing imprints
 Mr Risk (#October 7, 1950, #December 2, 1950) - under Ace Magazines imprint
 Our Flag Comics (#August 1, 1941 - #April 5, 1942)
 Penalty (#47 November 1955 - #48 January 1956)
 Real-Life Secrets (#September 1, 1949) - under Ace Periodicals imprint
 Real Love (#April 25, 1949 - #76 November 1956) - under AA Wyn imprint
 Real Secrets (#November 2, 1950 - #May 5, 1950) - under Ace Periodicals imprint
 Revealing Romances (#September 1, 1949 - #August 6, 1950) - under Ace Periodicals imprint
 Science Comics (#January 1, 1946 - #5 1946) - under Humor Publications imprint
 Scream Comics (#1 Autumn 1944 - #April 19, 1948) - under Humor Publications / Current Books / Ace imprint
 Space Action Comics (#June 1, 1952 - #October 3, 1952) - under Junior Books imprint
 Super-Mystery Comics (#July 1, 1940 - vol 8#6 July 1949) - under Periodical House and Ace Periodicals imprints
 Sure-Fire Comics (#June 1, 1940 - #October 4, 1940 - includes 2 issues #3's)
 Ten-Story Love (v29#3 June 1951 - v36#5 September 1956) - under Ace Periodicals imprint
 Trapped! (#October 1, 1954 - #April 4, 1955) - under Periodical House imprint
 Vicky Comics (October 1948 - #June 5, 1949) - under Ace Magazines imprint
 War Heroes (#May 1, 1952 - #April 8, 1953) - under Ace Magazines imprint
 Web of Mystery (#February 1, 1951 - #February 29, 1955) - under AA Wyn imprint
 Western Adventures Comics (#October 1, 1948 - #August 6, 1949) - under Ace Magazines imprint
 Western Love Trails (#November 7, 1949 - #March 9, 1950) - under AA Wyn imprint
 World War III (#March 1, 1953 - #May 2, 1953) - under Ace Periodicals imprint

Characters

 Ace McCoy (in Sure-Fire Comics)
 The Black Ace  (in Four Favourites, Super-Mystery Comics)
 The Black Spider (in Super-Mystery Comics)
 Buckskin  (in Super-Mystery Comics)
 Buck Steele (in Sure-Fire Comics)
 The Clown (in Super-Mystery Comics)
 Captain Courageous (in Banner Comics, Captain Courageous Comics, Four Favourites)
 Captain Victory (in Our Flag Comics)
 Corporal Flint of the RCMP (in Super-Mystery Comics)
 Doctor Nemesis (in Lightning Comics, Super-Mystery Comics). A version of this character has been adapted to Marvel Comics stories. 
 The Flag (in Four Favourites, Our Favourites)
 Green Arrowhead (in Indian Braves)
 Hap Hazard (in Four Favourites, Hap Hazard Comics)
 The Lancer (in Super-Mystery Comics)
 Lash Lightning and Lightning Girl (in Lightning Comics, Sure-Fire Comics (as Flash Lightning))
 Lone Warrior and Sidekick Dicky (in Banner Comics, Captain Courageous Comics)
 Magno the Magnetic Man (in Four Favourites, Super-Mystery Comics)
 Marvo the Magician (in Sure-Fire Comics)
 Mr. Risk (in Four Favourites, Men Against Crime, Mr. Risk, Our Favourites, Super-Mystery Comics)
 The Raven (in Sure-Fire Comics and Lightning Comics) based on Ace pulp character Moon Man.
 The Sword (in Captain Courageous Comics, Lightning Comics, Super-Mystery Comics)
 The Unknown (in Four Favourites)
 The Unknown Soldier (in Our Flag Comics)
 Vulcan (in Four Favourites, Super-Mystery Comics)
 Whiz Wilson, Time Traveler (in Sure-Fire Comics)
 X The Phantom Fed (in Sure-Fire Comics and Lightning Comics) based on Ace pulp character Secret Agent X.

References

External links

Comic book publishing companies of the United States
Defunct comics and manga publishing companies
Publishing companies established in 1940